Frederick Ellard (1824–1874) was an Australian classical music composer. Visiting Hungarian composer Miska Hauser was sufficiently impressed to dedicate an Australian publication in Ellard's honour.

Works
 1842 Sydney Corporation Quadrilles 
 1846 I think of thee 
 1850 Hayes Quadrille
 1854 Australian Bird Waltz 
 1854 Morceau de salon : sur Lucrʹece 
 1855 Crimea

Recordings
 Great Britain Polka 
 Australian Ladies- National Country Dances 
 Sydney Railroad Galop 
 Australian Quadrilles 
 I think of Thee

References

1824 births
1874 deaths
Australian classical composers
Australian conductors (music)
Australian male classical composers
Male conductors (music)
19th-century male musicians